This is a list of National Hockey League (NHL) players who have played at least one game in the NHL from 1917 to present and have a last name that starts with either "U" or "V".

List updated as of the 2018–19 NHL season.

U

 Gene Ubriaco
 Dominik Uher
 Igor Ulanov
 Norm Ullman
 Linus Ullmark
 Jeff Ulmer 
 Layne Ulmer
 David Ullstrom
 R. J. Umberger
 Matt Underhill
 Garry Unger
 Scottie Upshall
 Alexander Urbom 
 Stefan Ustorf

Va

 Urho Vaakanainen
 Ossi Vaananen
 Nicholas Vachon
 Rogatien Vachon
 Carol Vadnais
 Lubomir Vaic 
 Eric Vail
 Melville "Sparky" Vail
 Rick Vaive
 Boris Valabik
 Chris Valentine
 Rob Valicevic
 Rinat Valiev
 Juuso Valimaki
 Jack Valiquette 
 Steve Valiquette
 Curtis Valk
 Garry Valk
 Lindsay Vallis
 Shaun Van Allen
 John Van Boxmeer
 Bryce Van Brabant
 David Van der Gulik
 Wayne Van Dorp
 David Van Drunen
 Darren Van Impe
 Ed Van Impe
 James van Riemsdyk
 Trevor van Riemsdyk
 Mike Van Ryn
 John Vanbiesbrouck
 Ryan VandenBussche
 Jim Vandermeer
 Pete Vandermeer
 Chris VandeVelde
 Vitek Vanecek
 Thomas Vanek
 Vaclav Varada
 Petri Varis
 Semyon Varlamov
 Sergei Varlamov
 Phil Varone
 Jarkko Varvio
 Josef Vasicek
 Alex Vasilevsky
 Andrei Vasilevskiy
 Alexei Vasiliev
 Herbert Vasiljevs
 Andrei Vasilyev
 Dennis Vaske
 Elmer Vasko
 Rick Vasko
 Sami Vatanen
 Frank Vatrano
 Julien Vauclair
 Yvon Vautour
 Greg Vaydik

Ve–Vi

 Mike Vecchione
 Veini Vehvilainen
 Stephane Veilleux
 Mike Veisor
 Darren Veitch
 Lukas Vejdemo
 Joe Veleno
 Randy Velischek
 Mike Vellucci
 Vic Venasky
 Gary Veneruzzo
 Pat Verbeek
 Carter Verhaeghe
 Antoine Vermette
 Mark Vermette
 Joel Vermin
 Mike Vernace
 Kris Vernarsky
 Mike Vernon
 Max Veronneau
 Darcy Verot
 Claude Verret
 Kris Versteeg
 Leigh Verstraete
 Dennis Ververgaert
 Kristian Vesalainen
 Ryan Vesce
 Jim Vesey (born 1965)
 Jimmy Vesey (born 1993)
 Linden Vey
 Sid Veysey
 Georges Vezina
 Dennis Vial
 Steve Vickers
 Jeffrey Viel
 J. P. Vigier
 Alain Vigneault
 Vesa Viitakoski
 Gabriel Vilardi
 Claude Vilgrain
 Gilles Villemure
 Dan Vincelette
 Tomas Vincour
 Pete Vipond
 Hannu Virta
 Tony Virta
 Jake Virtanen
 Terry Virtue
 Mark Visheau
 Ivan Vishnevskiy
 Vitaly Vishnevskiy
 Lubomir Visnovsky
 Joe Vitale
 Harijs Vitolinsh
 Emanuel Viveiros

Vl–Vy

 Daniel Vladar
 Tomas Vlasak
 Marc-Edouard Vlasic
 Ed Vokes
 Tomas Vokoun
 Mickey Volcan
 Anton Volchenkov
 Alexandre Volchkov
 David Volek
 Alexander Volkov
 Doug Volmar
 Aaron Volpatti
 Reto Von Arx
 Phil Von Stefenelli
 Jan Vopat
 Roman Vopat
 Jakub Voracek
 Pavel Vorobiev
 Vladimir Vorobiev
 Mikhail Vorobyev
 Aaron Voros
 Carl Voss
 Slava Voynov
 Jakub Vrana
 Petr Vrana
 Radim Vrbata
 Vladimir Vujtek
 Mick Vukota
 Igor Vyazmikin
 David Vyborny
 Sergei Vyshedkevich

See also
 hockeydb.com NHL Player List - U
 hockeydb.com NHL Player List - V

Players